The Hannover Medical School ( abbreviated MHH in German), founded in 1965, is a university medical centre in the city of Hanover, in Germany, part of a regional medical network.

History
In June 1961, the National Science Council (WR) recommended that seven new academies of medicine be established in the Federal Republic of Germany so that the number of students of medicine would increase by 7,000. Within the month, the parliament of Lower Saxony approved plans to establish a state medical university here.

A committee to found a medical academy of Hanover met for the first time in December 1961. By February 1962, it was decided that this academy would be located in the city of Hanover. On April 1, 1963, the government of Lower Saxony issued an order to establish the Medical Academy of Hanover, which would become the MHH.

In 1965, after less than four years of planning, the structure of the medical school had been decided on and construction plans were complete. On May 17, 1965, a celebration marking the founding of the MHH was held at the University of Veterinary Medicine Hannover. The founding rector of the MHH was the internist, Professor Rudolf Schoen of the University of Göttingen. He was succeeded by the first elected rector, Professor Fritz Hartmann, who played a decisive role in both the concept and physical form of the MHH. The MHH was realised as a university campus on grounds in Roderbruch. The close proximity of the clinics and institutes guarantees intense integration of patient care, research and teaching.

The student-teacher ratio was ideal, with 12 teachers and 41 students, but this did not remain so for long. Within ten years, the number of students rose to about 1,000, and after only 20 years, to 3,000. With the addition of new departments, the original number of 12 professors increased to about 140. Only 12 years after the MHH was founded, 80 per cent of the planned departments and clinics had been realised.

As the MHH is both an academic and a clinical institution, the following watchword was chosen to express its commitment to its ideals and goals:

International
PhD students and scientists from all over the world are involved in a variety of research projects at the MHH and partner institutes. These activities are bundled in Hannover Biomedical Research School (HBRS).

See also
 University of Hanover

Notes

References

External links

 Official website of the Hannover Medical School 
 Official website of the Hannover Medical School 

Universities and colleges in Lower Saxony
Educational institutions established in 1965
1965 establishments in West Germany
Hannover
Buildings and structures in Hanover